William de Warenne may refer to:

William de Warenne, 1st Earl of Surrey (died 1088)
William de Warenne, 2nd Earl of Surrey (died 1138)
William de Warenne, 3rd Earl of Surrey (1119–1148)
William de Warenne, 5th Earl of Surrey (1166–1240)
William de Warenne (1256-1286) (1256–1286), only son and heir apparent to John de Warenne, 6th Earl of Surrey
William de Warenne (justice) (died 1209), justice of the Curia Regis
Sir William de Warenne, character in The Castle